Agetor (Ancient Greek: Ἀγήτωρ), alternatively spelled Hegetor (Hγήτωρ means "leader, ruler') was an epithet given to several gods of Greek mythology, primarily Zeus in the region of Lacedaemon. The name probably describes Zeus as the ruler of gods, humankind, and the universe in general. Agetor was also an epithet of Apollo. Finally, it was also an epithet applied to Hermes, who conducts the souls of men to the lower world.  Under this name Hermes had a statue at Megalopolis.

Notes

References 

 Euripides, Medea with an English translation by David Kovacs. Cambridge. Harvard University Press. 1994. Online version at the Perseus Digital Library. Greek text available from the same website.
 Pausanias, Description of Greece with an English Translation by W.H.S. Jones, Litt.D., and H.A. Ormerod, M.A., in 4 Volumes. Cambridge, MA, Harvard University Press; London, William Heinemann Ltd. 1918. . Online version at the Perseus Digital Library
Pausanias, Graeciae Descriptio. 3 vols. Leipzig, Teubner. 1903.  Greek text available at the Perseus Digital Library.

Epithets of Apollo
Epithets of Zeus
Epithets of Hermes
Religion in ancient Sparta